Andrew J. Looney (born November 5, 1963) is a game designer and computer programmer. He is also a photographer, a cartoonist, a video-blogger, and a marijuana-legalization advocate.

Andrew and Kristin Looney together founded the games company Looney Labs, where Andrew is the chief creative officer. Looney Labs has published most of his game designs, such as Fluxx, Chrononauts, and the Icehouse game system. His other game designs include Aquarius, Nanofictionary, IceTowers, Treehouse, and Martian Coasters.

Biography 
Andrew Looney as a youth became an Eagle Scout. He entered the University of Maryland at College Park in 1981 as a freshman with an undecided major between English and computer science. He eventually selected computer science.

He and Kristin, his future spouse, met in 1986 when he started at NASA's Goddard Space Flight Center as a software programmer. Kristin was a computer engineer designing computer chips. Keeping English as a side interest, he wrote "The Empty City", a science-fiction short story. Wanting a game in the story but feeling a card game as too boring, he created a fictional game, Icehouse, that used pyramids. Readers of the short story requested to learn how to play the game. Thus actual rules were invented for Icehouse, then plastic pyramid pieces were made to play the game. The pieces were made from resin in his apartment, which upset the landlord due to the smell. This led them to launch their own game company to sell the Icehouse game. After several years, Looney shut down Icehouse Games, Inc.

He and his wife launched Looney Laboratories in 1996 as a part-time home based design company. Andrew soon designed the Fluxx card game. He then went on to a brief career as a game programmer at Magnet Interactive Studios, where he created that company's only entry to the market, Icebreaker. Aquarius was Andy's and Labs' next game, launched in 1998. In 2002, a few years after Kristin went full-time with their company, Andy followed.

Patents & awards 
Andy has three U.S. patents and five Origins Awards.

Looney holds patents on the game mechanics for:

 Icehouse - U.S. Patent 4,936,585 - Method of manipulating and interpreting playing pieces
 https://patents.google.com/patent/US4936585A
 IceTowers - U.S. Patent 6,352,262 - Method of conducting simultaneous gameplay using stackable game pieces
 https://patents.google.com/patent/US6352262B1
 Chrononauts - U.S. Patent 6,474,650 - Method of simulation time travel in a card game
 https://patents.google.com/patent/US6474650B1

Looney has won the following game design awards:
 1999 — Mensa Mind Games: Mensa Select Award for Fluxx
 2000 — Origins Award: Best Abstract Board Game for Icehouse: The Martian Chess Set
Chrononauts
 2000 — Origins Award: Best Traditional Card Game
 2001 — Parents Choice Silver Honors
 2001 — Origins Award: Best Abstract Board Game for Cosmic Coasters
 2003 — Parents Choice Silver Honors Nanofictionary
 2007 — Origins Award: Best Board Game or Expansion of the Year for Treehouse
 2008 — Origins Award: Best Traditional Card Game of the Year for Zombie Fluxx
 Fall 2013 - Parents' Choice Recommended Seal category Games for Fluxx: The Board Game
 Spring 2014 - Parents' Choice FunStuff Award for Loonacy

Works 

 Aquarius
 Chrononauts
 Early American Chrononauts
 Cosmic Coasters
 Fluxx
 EcoFluxx
 Family Fluxx
 Zombie Fluxx
 Monty Python Fluxx
 Martian Fluxx
 Stoner Fluxx
 Star Fluxx
 Cartoon Network Fluxx
 Regular Show Fluxx
 Adventure Time Fluxx
 Holiday Fluxx
 Cthulhu Fluxx
 Pirate Fluxx
 Oz Fluxx
 Monster Fluxx
 Icebreaker
 Icehouse and other games played with the Icehouse pieces:
 IceTowers
 Martian Chess
 Treehouse
 Zark City
 Nanofictionary
 Proton
 Q*Turn

References

1963 births
Board game designers
Chess variant inventors
Living people